Carbonyl reductase 1, also known as CBR1, is an enzyme which in humans is encoded by the CBR1 gene. The protein encoded by this gene belongs to the short-chain dehydrogenases/reductases (SDR) family, which function as NADPH-dependent oxidoreductases having wide specificity for carbonyl compounds, such as quinones, prostaglandins, and various xenobiotics. Alternatively spliced transcript variants have been found for this gene.

Function 

Carbonyl reductase is one of several monomeric, NADPH-dependent oxidoreductases having wide specificity for carbonyl compounds. This enzyme is widely distributed in human tissues. Another carbonyl reductase gene, CBR3, lies close to this gene on chromosome 21q22.12. CBR1 metabolizes many toxic environmental quinones and pharmacological relevant substrates such as the anticancer doxorubicin. Several studies have shown that CBR1 plays a protective role in oxidative stress, neurodegeneration, and apoptosis. In addition, CBR1 inactivates lipid aldehydes during oxidative stress in cells. Therefore, CBR1 may play a beneficial role in protecting against cellular damage resulting from oxidative stress.

Polymorphisms 

Up-to-date two non-synonymous polymorphisms on CBR1 have been identified. The CBR1 V88I polymorphism encodes for a valine-to-isoleucine substitution at position 88 of the aminoacid chain. In vitro studies with recombinant proteins indicate that the CBR1 V88 isoform has a higher Vmax towards the substrates menadione (vitamin K3) and daunorubicin. Recent studies in human liver cytosols show that an untranslated polymorphism on the 3'UTR region of the CBR1 gene (rs9024) is associated with higher levels of the cardiotoxic metabolite doxorubicinol.

Structure

Gene 

Human CBR1 gene includes 8 exons.

Protein 

The enzyme consists of 277 amino acid residues and is widely distributed in human tissues such as liver, epidermis, stomach, small intestine, kidney, neuronal cells, and smooth muscle fibers. The best substrates of CBR1 are quinones, including ubiquinone-1 and tocopherolquinone (vitamin E). Ubiquinones (coenzyme Q) are constitutive parts of the respiratory chain, and tocopherolquinone protects lipids of biological membranes against lipid peroxidation, indicating that CBR1 may play an important role as an oxidation–reduction catalyst in biological processes.

Clinical significance
CBR1 has been reported to relate to tumor progression. Suppression of CBR1 expression was associated with poor prognosis in uterine endometrial cancer and uterine cervical squamous cell carcinoma. Previous studies showed that decreased CBR1 expression is associated with lymph node metastasis and poor prognosis in ovarian cancer, and induction of CBR1 expression in ovarian tumors leads to a spontaneous decrease in tumor size.

Recent study demonstrates that CBR1 attenuates apoptosis and promotes cell survival in pancreatic β cell lines under glucotoxic and glucolipotoxic conditions via reducing ROS generation. Their data demonstrates that CBR1 expression level and enzyme activity are decreased in pancreatic islets isolated from db/db mice, an animal model of type 2 diabetes. These results suggest that CBR1 may play a role in protecting pancreatic β-cells against oxidative stress under glucotoxic or glucolipotoxic conditions, and its reduced expression or activity may contribute to β-cell dysfunction in db/db mice or human type 2 diabetes.

In addition, CBR1 may play a critical role in prostaglandin F2α (PGF2α) synthesis in human amnion fibroblasts, and cortisol promotes the conversion of PGE2 into PGF2α via glucocorticoid receptor (GR)-mediated induction of CBR1 in human amnion fibroblasts. This stimulatory effect of cortisol on CBR1 expression may partly explain the concurrent increases of cortisol and PGF2α in human amnion tissue with labor, and these findings may account for the increased production of PGF2α in the fetal membranes prior to the onset of labor.

Interactions 

CBR1 has been shown to interact with Cortisol, C2 domain, and Flavonoid.

References

External links

Further reading 

 
 
 
 
 
 
 
 
 
 
 
 
 
 
 
 
 

Enzymes